Gorchakov Memorial School is a private boarding school that opened in 1999 in Pavlovsk, a suburb of Saint Petersburg, Russia. It was named after Russian diplomat Alexander Gorchakov, a classmate of Alexander Pushkin's. The main dormatory and dining area are in an historic, Alexander Brullov country house.

Boarding schools in Russia
Schools in Saint Petersburg
Cultural heritage monuments of federal significance in Saint Petersburg